A penis extender is an external medical device with tentative evidence as of 2019 for Peyronie's disease. It acts as a mechanical, traction device that stretches the human penis in the flaccid state to make it longer.

Description 
Penis extenders usually have a plastic ring that sits at the base of a flaccid penis, and another ring before the glans penis, with a traction device that runs along the sides of the organ. The wearer adjusts springs, which pull the penile shaft with the intention of stretching the flaccid penis to become longer.

Medical use 
There is tentative evidence for use in Peyronie's disease. As of 2019, studies have been small in size; many had difficulty carrying out the treatment during the study period, and people were not blinded to the treatment that they were receiving.

Adverse effects 
Adverse effects are not extensively reported in the literature, and they are usually mild and self-limiting, in part caused by lack of patient compliance with penile traction therapy (PTT). The most commonly reported symptoms with PTT include pain, erythema, ecchymoses, and pruritus. Another reported symptom was edema to the pubic bone, which is associated with vigorous usage. All of these adverse events are generally self-limited and resolve with discontinuation of PTT.

It should not be used if penile wounds, lacerations, or infected zones have not fully healed, and by those suffering certain diseases or disorders. Aggressive or incorrect uses of penis extenders can cause damage to skin and blood vessels, among other possible issues.

See also 
 Body dysmorphic disorder
 Erectile dysfunction
 Erection
 Human penis size
 Micropenis
 Penis enlargement

References

Bibliography

Further reading

External links 

 
 
 
 
 
 
 
 

Medical devices
Penis
Urology